Dreaming Lips is a 1932 French-German drama film directed by Paul Czinner and starring Elisabeth Bergner, Rudolf Forster and Anton Edthofer. The film is based on the play Mélo by Henri Bernstein. As was common at the time, the film was a co-production with a separate French-language version  made.

After Bergner and Czinner went into exile in Britain following the Nazi takeover, they remade the film in 1937. A further German remake was released in 1953, starring Maria Schell.

Cast
Elisabeth Bergner as Gaby
Rudolf Forster as Michael Marsden
Anton Edthofer as Peter
Margarethe Hruby as Christine
Jaro Fürth as Arzt
Peter Kroger as Kind
Karl Hannemann as Impresario
Ernst Stahl-Nachbaur as Polizist
Werner Pledath
Gustav Püttjer
Willi Schur

References

External links

1932 drama films
French drama films
German drama films
Films of the Weimar Republic
Films directed by Paul Czinner
Films with screenplays by Carl Mayer
Films with screenplays by Paul Czinner
French films based on plays
German multilingual films
German black-and-white films
Films about violins and violinists
French multilingual films
1932 multilingual films
1930s German films
1930s French films